Z90 may refer to:
EF50 vacuum tube (alternate name Z90)
IXUS Z90 camera
Stampede Airport (airport designation Z90)